is a luxury yacht currently owned and operated by the Sea Shepherd Conservation Society since March 2018.

Alchemy was donated in March 2018 by Alison, Lyle, and Taggart Turner to Sea Shepherd. The Turners are founders of the biotechnology company Invitrogen, as well as Alchemy Ventures, an organization that supports coral reef research and conservation.  The vessel was retrofitted in 2014 and it features scuba diving facilities.

The Alchemy was purchased by a private investor in August 2019.

See also
 Neptune's Navy, Sea Shepherd vessels
 Sea Shepherd Conservation Society operations

References

Sea Shepherd Conservation Society ships
1970 ships
Ships built in the Netherlands
Motor yachts